Michael Oliver may refer to:

Michael Oliver (actor) (born 1981), American actor
Michael Oliver (cardiologist) (1925–2015), British cardiologist
Michael Oliver (footballer, born 1957), Scottish football player and manager
Michael Oliver (footballer, born 1975) English footballer with Stockport, Darlington and Rochdale
Michael Oliver (Lord Mayor) (born 1940), Lord Mayor of London, 2001–2002
Michael Oliver (referee) (born 1985), English football referee
Michael Oliver (writer, broadcaster) (1937–2002), BBC broadcaster, writer and journalist on classical music
Michael Oliver, founder of the Republic of Minerva and the Phoenix Foundation
Michael Kelway Oliver (1925–2004), Canadian academic, political organizer and president of Carleton University
Michael Roderick Oliver (born 1938), English businessman

See also
Mike Oliver (disambiguation)